Elections to Liverpool City Council were held on Thursday 1 November 1900.

There were a total of 30 wards, each with one seat up for election, with the exception of Walton, which was a new ward with 3 councillors elected at this election.
There were 5 new seats at this election : Anfield (1 seat); Walton (3 seats) and Wavertree (1 seat).
Of the 32 seats up for election 17 seats were contested and 15 uncontested.

After the election, the composition of the council was:

Election result

Ward results

* - Retiring Councillor seeking re-election

Comparisons are made with the 1897 election results, as the retiring councillors were elected in that year.

Abercromby

Anfield

Breckfield

Brunswick

Castle Street

Dingle

Edge Hill

Everton

Exchange

Fairfield

Granby

Great George

Kensington

Kirkdale

Low Hill

Netherfield

North Scotland

Prince's Park

Sandhills

St. Anne's

St. Domingo

St. Peter's

Sefton Park East

Sefton Park West

South Scotland

Vauxhall

Walton

Warbreck

Wavertree

West Derby

Aldermanic election

On 9 November 1900, Councillor William Roberts (Conservative, Dingle, elected 1 November 1899) was elected by the Council (Councillors and Aldermen) as an Alderman and assigned to the newly created ward of Walton.

By-elections

No. 21 Abercromby, 29 January 1901

The resignation of Alderman Alexander Garnett (Conservative, elected as an alderman in 1883 1889 and 1895) was reported to the council on 5 December 1900.

Councillor Maxwell Hyslop Maxwell the younger (Conservative, Abercromby, elected 1 November 1898) was elected by the council as an alderman on 2 January 1901.

No. 26 Dingle, 27 November 1900

Caused by the election of Councillor William Roberts (Conservative, Dingle, elected 1 November 1899) was elected by the Council (Councillors and Aldermen) as an Alderman and assigned to the newly created ward of Walton.

No. 11 Kensington, 28 February 1901

The resignation of Alderman Sir Thomas Hughes (Conservative, elected as an alderman on 19 March 1891 and 9 November 1895) was reported to the council on 2 January 1901.

Councillor Dr. Thomas Clarke (Conservative, Kensington, elected 2 November 1898)
 was elected as an alderman by the council on 6 February 1901.

No. 10 Low Hill, 28 February 1901

The resignation of Councillor Charles Stewart Dean (Conservative, Low Hill, elected 1 November 1899) was reported to the Council on 6 February 1901.

No. 20 Great George

The resignation of Councillor John Henderson (Great George, elected 25 November 1898) was reported to the council on 6 March 1901.

No. 3 Anfield, 10 May 1901

Caused by the death of Councillor Robert Atwood Beaver (Conservative, Anfield, elected 1 November 1900) on 12 April 1901.

See also

 Liverpool City Council
 Liverpool Town Council elections 1835–1879
 Liverpool City Council elections 1880–present
 Mayors and Lord Mayors of Liverpool 1207–present
 History of local government in England

References

1900
Liverpool
November 1900 events
1900s in Liverpool